The 1960 San Francisco State Gators football team represented San Francisco State College—now known as San Francisco State University—as a member of the Far Western Conference (FWC) during the 1960 NCAA College Division football season. Led by Joe Verducci in his 11th and final year as head coach, San Francisco State compiled an overall record of 9–1 with a mark of 4–1 in conference play, placing second in the FWC. For the season the team outscored its opponents 247 to 47. The Gators played home games at Cox Stadium in San Francisco.

The Gators were dominant through much of the season, allowing touchdown or less in nine of the ten games. Their only loss was to FWC champion Humboldt State. In 11 years under Verducci, the Gators had a record of 74–31, for a winning percentage of .704. Verducci's teams won the conference title six times and they appeared in one bowl game the Pear Bowl in 1950.

Schedule

Team players in the NFL / AFL
The following San Francisco State players were selected in the 1961 NFL Draft.

The following San Francisco State players were selected in the 1961 AFL Draft.

The following player did not play football at San Francisco State, but completed his graduate degree at San Francisco State while playing in the NFL.

References

San Francisco State
San Francisco State Gators football seasons
San Francisco State Gators football